Future Worlds is a role-playing game published by Stellar Gaming Workshop in 1987.

Description
Future Worlds is a science-fiction space-adventure system set in an interstellar society of the far future. The game includes a section on Mystics, a class of magical spell-casters.

Publication history
Future Worlds was designed by Patrick Lesser, and published by Stellar Gaming Workshop in 1987 as an 80-page book.

Reception
Rick Swan reviewed Future Worlds in Space Gamer/Fantasy Gamer No. 83. Swan commented that "Future Worlds could've been a reasonably good supplement for those wishing to add an advanced combat system to another game. a browse through the spell lists might generate some ideas for an existing fantasy campaign. But as for the game itself – not for me."

Lawrence Schick commented that the game was "Heavy on charts and tables and light on character development."

References

Role-playing games introduced in 1987
Science fantasy role-playing games
Science fiction role-playing games